The 1989–90 NBA season was the Lakers' 42nd season in the National Basketball Association, and 30th in the city of Los Angeles. The Lakers drafted Yugoslavian center Vlade Divac with the 26th overall pick in the 1989 NBA draft. Despite the retirement of Kareem Abdul-Jabbar, and an NBA Finals defeat in which they were swept in four games by the Detroit Pistons, the Lakers got off to a fast start winning ten of their first eleven games, and holding a 35–11 record at the All-Star break, on their way finishing the regular season with a league-best 63–19 record.

Magic Johnson averaged 22.3 points, 6.6 rebounds, 11.5 assists and 1.7 steals per game, and was named to the All-NBA First Team, while James Worthy averaged 21.1 points and 6.0 rebounds per game, and was named to the All-NBA Third Team. In addition, Byron Scott provided the team with 15.5 points per game, while A.C. Green provided with 12.9 points and 8.7 rebounds per game, sixth man Orlando Woolridge contributed 12.7 points per game, Mychal Thompson averaged 10.1 points and 6.8 rebounds per game, and Divac contributed 8.5 points, 6.2 rebounds and 1.4 blocks per game off the bench, and was named to the NBA All-Rookie First Team. Three members of the team, Johnson, Worthy and Green were all selected for the 1990 NBA All-Star Game in Miami, with head coach Pat Riley coaching the Western Conference. Johnson won the All-Star MVP award, despite the Western Conference losing to the Eastern Conference, 130–113. Riley was also named Coach of the Year for the first time.

However, after defeating the Houston Rockets in four games in the Western Conference First Round of the playoffs, the Lakers were upset in the Western Conference Semi-finals by the 5th-seeded Phoenix Suns in five games. It was the first time in nine years that the Lakers did not reach the Western Conference Finals, ending a run that started in 1981, the longest series of consecutive NBA Conference Finals appearances since Bill Russell's Boston Celtics in 1969.

Following the season, Riley resigned after nine seasons and was replaced by Mike Dunleavy. He would return to coach the New York Knicks for the 1991–92 season. Also following the season, Orlando Woolridge was traded to the Denver Nuggets, and Michael Cooper was released to free agency, and left to play in Italy.

Johnson won the league's Most Valuable Player of the Year award (his third in four years) in a controversial voting over Charles Barkley of the Philadelphia 76ers. Johnson received fewer first-place votes (27 of the 92 cast) than Barkley (38), but totaled 636 points in the ballot compared to Barkley's 614.

Draft picks

Roster

Regular season

Season standings

z – clinched division title
y – clinched division title
x – clinched playoff spot

Record vs. opponents

Game log

Regular season

|- align="center"
|colspan="9" bgcolor="#bbcaff"|All-Star Break
|- style="background:#cfc;"
|- bgcolor="#bbffbb"

Playoffs

|- style="background:#cfc;"
| 1
| April 27
| Houston
| W 101–89
| James Worthy (34)
| James Worthy (11)
| Magic Johnson (14)
| Great Western Forum17,505
| 1–0
|- style="background:#cfc;"
| 2
| April 29
| Houston
| W 104–100
| James Worthy (32)
| Magic Johnson (7)
| Magic Johnson (14)
| Great Western Forum17,505
| 2–0
|- style="background:#fcc;"
| 3
| May 1
| @ Houston
| L 108–114
| James Worthy (26)
| Magic Johnson (8)
| Magic Johnson (18)
| The Summit16,611
| 2–1
|- style="background:#cfc;"
| 4
| May 3
| @ Houston
| W 109–88
| James Worthy (20)
| James Worthy (7)
| Magic Johnson (8)
| The Summit16,611
| 3–1
|-

|- style="background:#fcc;"
| 1
| May 8
| Phoenix
| L 102–104
| Johnson & Worthy (22)
| A.C. Green (13)
| Magic Johnson (14)
| Great Western Forum17,505
| 0–1
|- style="background:#cfc;"
| 2
| May 10
| Phoenix
| W 124–100
| James Worthy (27)
| A.C. Green (13)
| Magic Johnson (14)
| Great Western Forum17,505
| 1–1
|- style="background:#fcc;"
| 3
| May 12
| @ Phoenix
| L 103–117
| James Worthy (27)
| A.C. Green (10)
| Magic Johnson (16)
| Arizona Veterans Memorial Coliseum14,487
| 1–2
|- style="background:#fcc;"
| 4
| May 13
| @ Phoenix
| L 101–114
| Magic Johnson (43)
| A.C. Green (18)
| Magic Johnson (10)
| Arizona Veterans Memorial Coliseum14,487
| 1–3
|- style="background:#fcc;"
| 5
| May 15
| Phoenix
| L 103–106
| Magic Johnson (43)
| Divac & Johnson (8)
| Magic Johnson (7)
| Great Western Forum17,505
| 1–4
|-

Player statistics

NOTE: Please write the players statistics in alphabetical order by last name.

Season

Playoffs

Awards and records
 Magic Johnson, NBA Most Valuable Player Award
 Pat Riley, NBA Coach of the Year Award
 Magic Johnson, All-NBA First Team
 James Worthy, All-NBA Third Team
 Magic Johnson, NBA All-Star Game Most Valuable Player Award
 Vlade Divac, NBA All-Rookie Team 1st Team

Transactions

References

Los Angeles Lakers seasons
Los Angle
Los Angle
Los Angle